Pre-mRNA-processing factor 19 is a protein that in humans is encoded by the PRPF19 gene.

In S. cerevisiae, Pso4 has pleiotropic functions in DNA recombination and in error-prone nonhomologous end-joining DNA repair.[supplied by OMIM]

Interactions
PRPF19 has been shown to interact with CDC5L.

References

Further reading